The 1984 Soviet Cup was an association football cup competition of the Soviet Union. The winner of the competition, Dinamo Moscow qualified for the continental tournament.

Competition schedule

First preliminary round
All games took place on February 18, 1984.

Second preliminary round
The base game day was February 22, 1984

Round of 16
The base game day was February 26, 1984

Quarter-finals
The base game day was March 2, 1984

Semi-finals

Final

External links
 Complete calendar. helmsoccer.narod.ru
 1984 Soviet Cup. Footballfacts.ru
 1984 Soviet football season. RSSSF

Soviet Cup seasons
Cup
Soviet Cup
Soviet Cup